Poyntonophrynus damaranus is a species of toad in the family Bufonidae. This species was previously known as Bufo damaranus, which is now considered a synonym. This anuran is endemic to Kaokoveld-Waterberg in area of northern and northwestern Namibia. The validity of this species has been questioned.

Habitat
The ecology of this species unknown, but it is assumed to live in semi-arid habitats and breed in temporary waterbodies.

References

damaranus
Frogs of Africa
Amphibians of Namibia
Endemic fauna of Namibia
Amphibians described in 1954
Taxa named by Robert Mertens
Taxonomy articles created by Polbot